The 1920 Boston College Eagles football team represented Boston College an independent during the 1920 college football season. Led by second-year head coach Frank Cavanaugh, Boston College compiled a record of 8–0. Cavanaugh hired Wesley Englehorn as an assistant for the year. Luke Urban was the team captain.

Schedule

References

Boston College
Boston College Eagles football seasons
College football undefeated seasons
Boston College Eagles football
1920s in Boston